Meituan (literally "beautiful group"), formerly Meituan-Dianping, is a Chinese shopping platform for locally found consumer products and retail services including entertainment, dining, delivery, travel and other services. The company is headquartered in Beijing and was founded in 2010 by Wang Xing. The company operates different apps and websites for different services. The Meituan site offers deals of the day by selling vouchers on local services and entertainment. By May 2014, the company had 5,000 employees. In 2015, Meituan merged with Dazhong Dianping and changed its name to "Meituan-Dianping". dianping.com (大众点评网 Dàzhòng diǎnpíng wǎng, literally "public reviews net") hosts consumer reviews of restaurants, similar to Yelp and TripAdvisor, and also offers group buying similar to Groupon. Meituan-Dianping is one of the world's largest online and on-demand delivery platforms. It has over 290 million monthly active users and 600 million registered users as of April 2018. In Q2 2021, GTV of Meituan food delivery business increased by 59.5% year over year. The daily average number of food delivery transactions increased by 58.9% year over year to 38.9 million.

Company 
Meituan.com is a group-discount website that sells vouchers from merchants for deals, subject to a minimum number of buyers who demand a discount, from which Meituan generates commissions. Meituan.com generates most of its revenue from mobile application services. The company has partnering agreements with over 400,000 local Chinese businesses. Meituan accounts for the largest market share by revenue, followed by LaShou and 55tuan.

History 
Piloted in Shanghai and Beijing, Meituan had rapidly expanded to second-tier and third-tier cities, totalling 200 million users in 2015. Meituan.com became a dominating company in China after a rapid consolidation of the deal-of-the-day companies. Earlier estimates show that there were 2000 voucher selling companies in the mid-2000s and due to intense competition in the industry only a few have emerged as dominant players. In 2014 it accounted for 60% of the market share of deal-of-the-day group-buying websites in China. The company received initial funding of $12 million from Sequoia Capital.  In May 2014, global growth equity firm General Atlantic led a $300 million Series C funding round with two other investors. On 8 October 2015, Meituan and Dianping, a Chinese group buying site, became one company. On 19 January 2016, Meituan Dianping announced that it has raised more than $3.3 billion. On September 20, 2018, Meituan Dianping debuted on the Hong Kong stock exchange at an IPO price of HK$69 per share.

The company was renamed from "Meituan Dianping" to Meituan with effect from September 30, 2020.

In April 2021, Meituan raised $9.98 billion in additional financing via the sale of $3 billion in convertible bonds and $7 billion in equities. The funds will be utilized to expand into China's groceries space as well as to develop autonomous technologies in the drone and delivery space. The same month, the State Administration of Market Regulation announced an investigation into Meituan for alleged anticompetitive practices. By May 2021, increased regulatory scrutiny led to almost $40 billion being wiped from the company's overall value.

Meituan networking marketing 
Meituan is a Chinese O2O (online-to-offline) local life service platform, connecting over 240 million consumers and five million local merchants via a comprehensive array of e-commerce services and products. It has 600 million users and almost 4.5 million business partners that cover nearly all China. About 35 million people use the service every day. Meituan offers a one-stop “travel life” service platform for users in order to achieve coverage of full consumption in different places. Therefore, now there are 70 million users of hotel and travel businesses in total.

In 2020, the company will achieve revenue of RMB 114.8 billion, with 511 million annual users (mainly from the takeaway business in 2020) and 6.8 million active merchants. In 2020, the company will achieve revenue of RMB 114.8 billion, with 511 million annual users (mainly from the takeaway business in 2020), 6.8 million active merchants, 355 million domestic hotel nights, ranking first in the industry in the amount of hotel nights, and a solid market share for Meituan takeaway, making Meituan the leading local lifestyle service platform. Meituan has become the leading local lifestyle service platform.

Management and administration 
The company is headquartered in Beijing and was founded in 2010 by Wang Xing. Prior to starting Meituan, Wang founded Xiaonei and Fanfou, which were based on Facebook and Twitter respectively.

Main assets 

 Meituan
 Meituan Waimai
 DianPing
 Meituan Youxuan
 Meituan Shangou
 Meituan Dache
 Maoyan Entertainment
 Li Auto 13.23%
 Jilin Yillion Bank 28.5%

Further reading

Lei, Ya-Wen. “Delivering Solidarity: Platform Architecture and Collective Contention in China’s Platform Economy.” American Sociological Review, (February 2021). https://doi.org/10.1177/0003122420979980.

References

External links

 

 
Privately held companies of China
Deal of the day services
Companies based in Beijing
Chinese companies established in 2010
Internet properties established in 2010
Online retailers of China
2018 initial public offerings
Super-apps